The Louis St. Gaudens House and Studio is a historic house at Dingleton Hill and Whitten Roads in Cornish, New Hampshire.  The -story gambrel-roofed wood-frame structure was designed by Moses Johnson and built in 1793–94 at the Shaker village in Enfield, New Hampshire.  At that site the building served as the main meeting space for the Shakers, with a main meeting space on the ground floor, offices on the second floor, and guest living quarters in the attic space.  The building is similar in construction to buildings designed by Johnson for the Shaker villages in Canterbury, New Hampshire and Sabbathday Lake, Maine.

The Shakers stopped using the building in 1893, and sold it in 1902 to the sculptor Louis St. Gaudens. St. Gaudens had the building disassembled and moved to its present location, making a number of alterations to it in the process. One of the two main entrance doors was relocated to the side of the building, and dormers were added to enlarge the attic space. The lower floors were divided into a living space (living room below, bedrooms above) and a two-story studio space. A -story ell was added in 1904.

In addition to the sculptural studio, Annetta and her son, Paul, operated a pottery kiln, known as "Orchard Kiln" on the property.

St. Gaudens was brother to Augustus St. Gaudens, who was a leading figure in the Cornish Art Colony that flourished in the early 20th century, and whose own Cornish property is now a National Historic Site and National Historic Landmark.  This property was occupied by St. Gaudens and his wife until their deaths in the 1950s, and then by their son Paul, a potter.

The house was listed on the National Register of Historic Places in 1972.

See also
National Register of Historic Places listings in Sullivan County, New Hampshire

References

Houses on the National Register of Historic Places in New Hampshire
Houses completed in 1902
Houses in Sullivan County, New Hampshire
Artists' studios in the United States
National Register of Historic Places in Sullivan County, New Hampshire
Cornish, New Hampshire